Andrew Orlando Valmon (born January 1, 1965) is an American former 400 meters runner.

Valmon was born in Brooklyn, New York, and raised in Manchester Township, New Jersey, where he attended Manchester Township High School. He attended college at Seton Hall University and graduated in 1987 with a degree in communications.

Valmon won the silver medal at the World Indoor Athletics Championships in 1991 in Seville. In 1992 he won a gold medal with the American 4 × 400 m relay team at the Olympic Games in Barcelona. The same year, Valmon set his personal best of 44.28 seconds.

He is now the track & field head coach at the University of Maryland, and coaches a summer camp at the university. He is married to Meredith Rainey, who is also an Olympic runner. Valmon is a member of the Phi Beta Sigma fraternity.

Georgetown University
From 1999 to 2003 Valmon was an assistant track coach at Georgetown University.

University of Maryland Track and Field
Eleventh season as track coach. 
During his tenure as head coach, 50+ student-athletes have earned All-American honors for their athletic performances.  Maryland track and field athletes consistently rank among the top of their peers with the cross country program earning the school's award for the highest team GPA three years in a row, in 2013, 2014, and 2015.

2012 London Olympics
Valmon named United States Head Track and Field coach on February 11, 2011.

References

External links

1965 births
Living people
American male sprinters
Athletes (track and field) at the 1988 Summer Olympics
Athletes (track and field) at the 1992 Summer Olympics
Olympic gold medalists for the United States in track and field
Sportspeople from Brooklyn
Seton Hall Pirates men's track and field athletes
Maryland Terrapins track and field coaches
World Athletics Championships medalists
People from Manchester Township, New Jersey
Sportspeople from Ocean County, New Jersey
Track and field athletes from New Jersey
Track and field athletes from New York City
Medalists at the 1992 Summer Olympics
Medalists at the 1988 Summer Olympics
World Athletics record holders (relay)
Goodwill Games medalists in athletics
World Athletics Championships athletes for the United States
Maryland Terrapins cross country coaches
Georgetown Hoyas track and field coaches
World Athletics Indoor Championships medalists
World Athletics Championships winners
Competitors at the 1990 Goodwill Games
Competitors at the 1994 Goodwill Games